Kim Kalicki (born 27 June 1997) is a German bobsledder who competes for TuS Eintracht Wiesbaden 1846. She also representing the Germany national team since 2015 and won the silver medal in the two-woman bobsleigh event at the  Bobsleigh World Championships in 2020 and 2021 with Kira Lipperheide and Ann-Christin Strack, respectively.

Career 
Former track and field athlete Kim Kalicki switched into bobsleigh  at the age of 17. She made her debut in the European Bobsleigh Cup on the track in Winterberg in November, 2015 and took second place behind Sabrina Duljevic with her brakewoman Ann-Christin Strack. At the end of the 2015/16 season, she finished sixth overall in the European Bobsleigh Cup with 438 points. She qualified that season for the 2016 Junior Bobsleigh World Championships, which were held in Winterberg. She competed again together with Ann-Christin Strack and secured the silver medal behind the German team, consisting of Stephanie Schneider and Lisa Buckwitz.

In 2016/17 season, Kim Kalicki competed only one race in the European Cup competition in Winterberg on January 26, 2017. In this competition she took fifth place together with her brakewoman Lisa Sophie Gericke. They also competed at the 2017 Junior World Championships on the track in Winterberg, where she took third place behind British Mica Mcneill and compatriot Anna Köhler's team.

In 2017/18 season, Kim Kalicki and her brakewoman Lisa Sophie Gericke took consecutive third places in the European Cup competitions in Lillehammer on November 11 and 12, 2017. On January 12, 2018, with her brakewoman Sarah Noll, she was again able to achieve a podium finish in the European Cup on the course in Winterberg, behind Christin Senkel's team. At the end of the season she finished sixth in the overall standings of the European Cup with 410 points. This season she also competed at the Junior Bobsleigh World Championships and took third place with her brakewoman Lena Zelichowski behind the Romanian bobsled by Andreea Grecu and the German bobsled by Laura Nolte.

In 2018/19 season, she completed her first race of the season on January 10, 2019 in Innsbruck and, won the bobsleigh European Cup for the first time with her brakewoman Kira Lipperheide. The day after, they also won the second competition on the Olympic ice track in Igls. They also competed together at the 2019 World Junior Championships, finishing third place in the normal competition behind Austrian  Katrin Beierl and Romanian Andreea Grecu's  bobsleigh.

Before the 2019/20 season, Kim Kalicki took part in the German championship with Viktoria Dönicke in Oberhof and they secured second place behind Laura Nolte'steam. She made her debut world cup race on December 7, 2019 in Lake Placid with her brakewoman Vanessa Mark and they were able to go straight to the podium finish behind American Kaillie Humphries and the bobsleigh of the German's Stephanie Schneider.

Career results 
All results are sourced from the International Bobsleigh and Skeleton Federation (IBSF).

World Cup results

Two-woman

Monobob

References

External links
 
 Kim Kalicki at the Bob und Schlittenverband Deutschland 

1997 births
Living people
German female bobsledders
Olympic bobsledders of Germany
Bobsledders at the 2022 Winter Olympics
Sportspeople from Wiesbaden
21st-century German women